Justin Raúl Cuero Palacio (born 18 March, 2004) is an Ecuadorean football player who plays as a forward for Independiente del Valle. He played as Ecuador finished runners-up at the 2022 South American Games and represented his country at the 2023 South American U-20 Championship.

Early life
Cuero is from Esmeraldas, Ecuador, in the north-western part of the country. He came from the Independiente del Valle football academy.

International career
Cuero was selected to play Football at the 2022 South American Games in October 2022 for Ecuador in Asunción. He scored a hat-trick in the semi-final against Uruguay to help his team to the final against hosts Paraguay.
Cuero excelled playing for Ecuador at the 2023 South American U-20 Championship. Cuero was Ecuador's top scorer in the initial phase of the tournament from which they qualified for the Hexagonal group stage. Cuero scored four goals in total  at the tournament, including two against Paraguay that ensured his country finished in the top four and qualified from the Hexagonal group stage for the 2023 FIFA U-20 World Cup to be held in Indonesia. Cuero thanked the Ecuadorean fans for helping the team achieve their never-say-die attitude.

Style of play
Cuero has been described as a target man style centre forward, adept at playing on his own up-front. He has also been described as being “powerful physically and with good movements in the area to make space for himself”.

References

External links

2004 births
Living people
Ecuadorian footballers
Ecuador youth international footballers
Association football forwards
C.S.D. Independiente del Valle footballers 
Sportspeople from Esmeraldas, Ecuador